Guédiawaye is a town and département of the Dakar Region of Senegal.  Lying on the Atlantic Ocean to the north east of Dakar city centre, in 2013 it had a population of 329,659.  Until the mid-2000s, the département was part of Pikine.

Administration
For administrative purposes the town is also a single arrondissement divided into 5 communes d'arrondissement which are (2013 population in brackets):
 Golf Sud (92,345)
 Sam Notaire (78,660)
 Ndiarème Limamoulaye (35,171)
 Wakhinane Nimzatt (89,721)
 Médina Gounass (33,762)

History
The town was founded in the 1950s as a planned commuter town for the city of Dakar.  It has a large covered market.  A further, informal, community grew up adjacent to it from the 1960s.

Notable people from the town include the football goalkeeper Tony Sylva.

Twin towns - sister cities
Guédiawaye is twinned with:
Birmingham, Alabama, United States.
Tifariti, Sahrawi Arab Democratic Republic.

Image gallery

References
GeoHive: Senegal
Mariko Shiohata, The Literacy Environment and the Acquisition and Application of Literacy: A case study from Senegal

Populated places in Dakar Region
Communes of Senegal
Populated places established in the 1950s
1950s establishments in Senegal